Joseph "Joe" Kneipp (born 27 September 1973 in Brisbane, Queensland) is a professional squash player from Australia.

Kneipp was born in Brisbane and grew up near Cairns. He began playing squash at the age of seven. As a junior, he won the Australian under-13 squash championship title. At the age of 14, he attended the Australian Institute of Sport for a year. He captained the Australian team which won the world junior team title in 1992.

Kneipp joined the professional circuit in 1994. His career-high world ranking to date is World No. 10 in January 2004. That year, he finished runner-up to Thierry Lincou in the Super Series Finals.

Kneipp won a gold medal in the mixed doubles at the 2006 Commonwealth Games, partnering Natalie Grinham. He also won the mixed doubles title at the 2006 World Doubles Squash Championships, partnering Rachael Grinham.

Since 2002, Joe has been coached by his brother Daniel Kneipp. Joe and Dan write a regular column called Team Kneipp at the website Squash Talk.

External links 
 Profile at psa-squash.com
 
 
 
 
 Interview at squashsite.co.uk (May 2004)

1973 births
Living people
Australian male squash players
Commonwealth Games gold medallists for Australia
Commonwealth Games bronze medallists for Australia
Commonwealth Games medallists in squash
Squash players at the 2002 Commonwealth Games
Squash players at the 2006 Commonwealth Games
Australian Institute of Sport squash players
Sportsmen from Queensland
Sportspeople from Brisbane
Competitors at the 2005 World Games
20th-century Australian people
21st-century Australian people
Medallists at the 2002 Commonwealth Games
Medallists at the 2006 Commonwealth Games